is a Japanese jidaigeki or period drama that was on prime-time television from 1969 to 2011, making it the longest-running jidaigeki in Japanese television history. The title character is the historic Tokugawa Mitsukuni, former vice-shōgun and retired second daimyō of the Mito Domain. In the guise of Mitsuemon, a retired crepe merchant from Echigo, he roams Japan with two samurai retainers, fun-loving Sasaki Sukesaburō (Suke-san) and studious Atsumi Kakunoshin (Kaku-san). An episode typically starts with some injustice perpetrated by a corrupt official, a wealthy merchant or a gangster. The travelers arrive incognito, discover the injustice and quietly investigate it. The episode concludes with a brawl in which the unarmed, disguised protagonists defeat a crowd of samurai and gangsters, culminating in the presentation of the inrō that reveals the hero's identity. Afterwards, the hero passes judgement on the villains, sets things straight with comments and encouragement, and then continues with his journey.

The drama was adapted into a film in 1978.

History and characters
Five actors have portrayed the lead character in the series. Eijirō Tōno created the part and appeared in 13 seasons. His successor was Kō Nishimura. Asao Sano followed and then Kōji Ishizaka took the role in two seasons, quitting for cancer treatments. Kōtarō Satomi played Mitsuemon from 2002 until the end of the series in 2011.

The character normally sports a pointed white beard. He wears the lavish garb of a wealthy retiree and carries a walking stick (a staff), which also serves as his defensive weapon in combat.

Singer-actor Ryōtarō Sugi was the series' first Suke-san, followed by Kōtarō Satomi, who many years later took over the lead role. Teruhiko Aoi was next, then Yūji Kishimoto, and Ryūji Harada. Opposite them, Tadashi Yokouchi, Shin'ya Ōwada, Goro Ibuki, Jundai Yamada, and Masashi Gōda have played Kaku-san. Ichiro Nakatani played Kazaguruma no Yashichi, a ninja who helped Mitsuemon. Evil characters who tried to kill Mitsuemon  were played by such actors as Shigeru Tsuyuguchi (1st season) and Mikio Narita (3rd season).

In each of the show's 42 seasons, various other regular characters joined the retinue. For many years, they included the food-loving commoner Hachibei, the reformed thieves Kazaguruma no Yashichi (a former ninja whose main weapon is a shuriken with pinwheel, with a dagger as his sidearm) and his wife Kasumi no Oshin, the ninja Tsuge no Tobizaru, and kunoichi Kagerō Ogin. Portrayed by Kaoru Yumi, Ogin was the lead character in a light-hearted spinoff, Mito Kōmon Gaiden Kagerō Ninpō-chō. The same actress took on a new role, Hayate no Oen.

Many former regular actors appeared in the show's gala 1000th special episode, which aired on December 15, 2003. A 1978 film distributed by Toei Company shared the cast, production crew, and title.

Since its inception, the program has been a mainstay of the Panasonic Drama Theater (formerly known as the National Theater), sponsored by Panasonic. The TBS network aired the show throughout Japan, and showed reruns on both its analogue stations and its CS satellite channel. For nearly three decades, Mito Kōmon shared the time slot with Ōoka Echizen, and various actors and actresses appeared in both series.

An unusual feature of the series is that the credits list the maker of the inrō.

The last episode aired on December 19, 2011.

There was also an animated adaptation called Manga Mito Kōmon (まんが水戸黄門) that aired during 1981-1982, animated by Knack Productions.

In the light novel Death March kara Hajimaru Isekai Kyousoukyoku, the main protagonist quotes Mito Komon frequently. He also made a firm by the name Echigoya.

Cast
Season1
Eijirō Tōno as Mito Kōmon 
Ryōtarō Sugi as Sasaki Sukesaburō (Sukesan)
Tadashi Yokouchi as Atsumi Kakunoshin (Kakusan)
Ichirō Nakatani as Kazaguruma no Yahichi
Keiko Yumi as Ochō
Yumi Iwai
Shigeru Tsuyuguchi as Furukawa Hyōgo

Film cast
Eijirō Tōno as Mito Kōmon
Kōtarō Satomi as Sukesaburō (Sukesan)
Shinya Owada as Atsumi Kakunoshin (Kakusan)
Gentaro Takahashi as Hachibei
Ichirō Nakatani as Kazaguruma no Yahichi
Kōji Wada as Genpachiro Tsurugi
Komaki Kurihara as Yumi Okumura
Toshiro Mifune as Sakuzaemon Okumura
Hajime Hana as Rokubei
Hitoshi Ueki as Sukehachi
Yoshio Inaba as Sasaya
Tatsuo Endō as Yadayu Kurobe
Nobuo Kawai as Hankuro Kosaka
Toru Abe as Mondo Murai

References

Bibliography

External links
Mito Kōmon at TBS (in Japanese)
Mito Kōmon at C.A.L (in Japanese)
Mito Kōmon at IMDb

Jidaigeki television series
TBS Television (Japan) dramas
Mainichi Broadcasting System original programming
1969 Japanese television series debuts
2011 Japanese television series endings